Greenall School, also known as Greenall High School is a secondary education institute located in Balgonie, Saskatchewan, which offers grades 9 through 12. It serves students from Balgonie, as well as the nearby towns/communities of Coppersands, Edenwold, Kronau, McLean, Pilot Butte and White City. Greenall offers a variety of extracurricular activities, including an advanced placement academic program.

Greenall School has previously been a combined middle school and high school, serving grades 4-12.

References

External links
Greenall High School 

High schools in Saskatchewan
Educational institutions in Canada with year of establishment missing